is a railway station on the AbukumaExpress in the city of Fukushima, Fukushima Prefecture, Japan.

Lines

Station layout
Fukushima Gakuin-mae Station has one elevated side platform serving a single bi-directional track. The station is unattended.

Adjacent stations

History
Fukushima Gakuin-mae Station opened on March 11, 2000.

Passenger statistics
In fiscal 2015, the station was used by an average of 344 passengers daily (boarding passengers only).

Surrounding area
Fukushima College

See also
 List of Railway Stations in Japan

References

External links

  Abukuma Express home page 

Railway stations in Fukushima Prefecture
Abukuma Express Line
Railway stations in Japan opened in 2000
Fukushima (city)